Noble Okello Ayo (born July 20, 2000) is a Canadian professional soccer player who plays as a midfielder for New England Revolution II in MLS Next Pro.

Early life
Okello began playing soccer at age six with the North York Hearts SC. He later played for Mooredale SC before joining the Toronto FC Academy in 2013. On August 20, 2017, he was part of the U17 side that beat Juventus U17 to capture the inaugural International Youth Soccer Cup.

Club career

Toronto FC
In 2016, he appeared in one match for Toronto FC III in League1 Ontario. In 2017, he scored one goal in 13 appearances and made a further two appearances in 2018.

In September 2017, Okello signed his first professional contract with Toronto FC II in the USL. On October 6, 2017, he made his professional debut against Bethlehem Steel FC. Following the conclusion of USL season, Okello was invited to train with the U19 team of VfL Wolfsburg. On January 10, 2018, he played a full 90 minutes for their U19 side in a 2–1 victory over Hallescher FC where he scored the equalizing goal in the 88th minute He then returned to Toronto, to join the Toronto FC first team's 2018 pre-season training camp. It was later reported that VfL Wolfsburg had made three separate transfer bids to sign Okello, which would see his club receive a six figure transfer fee in addition to appearance fees and sell on percentage fee.

In January 2019, Okello signed a first-team contract with Toronto FC in Major League Soccer. He made his first-team debut for Toronto on August 14 against Ottawa Fury FC in the second leg of their 2019 Canadian Championship semi-final series. He made his MLS debut on July 21, 2020, against the New England Revolution. He was loaned to the second team for some matches in 2021. He scored his first goal for TFCII on June 30, converting a penalty kick against Tormenta FC. Upon completion of the 2021 season, Okello's option for the 2022 season would be picked up by Toronto. After appearing in four of the first five matches of the 2022 season, Okello suffered an injury that kept him out of action for five months. After the end of the 2022 season, he departed the club, upon the expiry of his contract.

Loan to HB Køge
On September 25, 2020, Okello was sent out on loan to Danish 1st Division club HB Køge, the same club that his teammate Rocco Romeo was also on loan with. On September 30, he made his debut for Køge, coming on as a second-half substitute and scored a goal from 35 metres out.

New England Revolution II
In February 2023, he went on trial with MLS club LA Galaxy. Afterwards, he went on trial with the New England Revolution. In March 2023, he signed a contract with their second team, New England Revolution II, in MLS Next Pro.

International career
Okello made his debut in the Canadian youth system attending a camp in September 2016 with the Canada U17 team. He was named to the roster for the 2017 CONCACAF U-17 Championship, where he made his international debut on April 22, 2017 against Costa Rica U17.

In May 2018, Okello was called up to the Canadian U21 side for the 2018 Toulon Tournament.  In October 2018, Okello was named to the Canadian U20 squad for the 2018 CONCACAF U-20 Championship. He scored a brace in the tournament opener against Dominica, a 4–0 victory. Okello was named to the Canadian U-23 provisional roster for the 2020 CONCACAF Men's Olympic Qualifying Championship on February 26, 2020.

Okello was named to the Canadian senior team for the 2019 CONCACAF Gold Cup. Okello made his senior debut on January 7, 2020, against Barbados as a substitute in a 4–1 victory.

Career statistics

Club

International

References

External links 
 
 

2000 births
Living people
Canadian soccer players
Canadian expatriate soccer players
Black Canadian soccer players
Association football midfielders
League1 Ontario players
Soccer players from Toronto
Toronto FC players
Toronto FC II players
HB Køge players
USL Championship players
USL League One players
Canadian people of Ugandan descent
Homegrown Players (MLS)
Major League Soccer players
Canadian expatriate sportspeople in Denmark
Expatriate men's footballers in Denmark
Canada men's youth international soccer players
Canada men's under-23 international soccer players
New England Revolution II players
MLS Next Pro players